Anaches semicylindricus is a species of beetle in the family Cerambycidae. It was described by Masao Hayashi in 1974. It is known from Taiwan.

References

Pteropliini
Beetles described in 1974